Keith William Twort Raffan (born 21 June 1949) is a former British politician. From 1983 to 1992, he served in the British House of Commons as the Conservative Member of Parliament (MP) for the Delyn constituency in Wales. Then from 1999 to 2005, he was a Scottish Liberal Democrat Member of the Scottish Parliament (MSP) for the Mid Scotland and Fife region.

Early life
Raffan was born in Aberdeen and educated at Trinity College, Glenalmond and Corpus Christi College, Cambridge.

Parliamentary career
Originally a Conservative, he was in the 1970s a chairman of Pressure for Economic and Social Toryism (precursor of the Tory Reform Group), placing him on the left of the Tories. At this time he stood unsuccessfully for Parliament at Dulwich in February 1974 and East Aberdeenshire in October 1974.

He was a Conservative Member of Parliament (MP) in Westminster for the Welsh seat of Delyn from 1983–92, but his views on issues like drugs put him out of favour with the prevailing leadership of Margaret Thatcher, and he was never made a Minister. Raffan was one of the few Conservative MPs to support the 'stalking horse' leadership challenge of Anthony Meyer (his constituency neighbour in north Wales) against Thatcher in 1989, and he then supported Michael Heseltine's challenge to Thatcher the following year.

After Parliament
Raffan stood down from Delyn at the 1992 general election and abandoned the Tories. After working as a broadcaster in New York, and then for Welsh TV Channel HTV, he joined the Liberal Democrats in order to gain a parliamentary seat, and moved to Scotland.

In the run up to the 2018 local elections, he wrote a letter to the Evening Standard declaring that he was going to vote for the Labour Party in Kensington where he was living.

He has subsequently left his 3rd political party and now considers himself an Independent.

Later political career
There he first stood (unsuccessfully) in the European Parliament by-election for North East Scotland in 1998, and then at the 1999 Scottish Parliament election he was elected as a regional list MSP to represent Mid Scotland and Fife.

He was one of three Liberal Democrat MSPs (along with Donald Gorrie and John Farquhar Munro) to oppose the coalition with the Labour Party in the Scottish Parliament in 1999, and was alone in his Liberal Democrat colleagues in not backing Donald Dewar for First Minister (he abstained from the vote) that year. He has been implicated in various accusations of abuse against his former employees.

Raffan was re-elected at the 2003 Scottish Parliament election and he also became a Vice Convener of the Scottish Liberal Democrats.  However, in December 2004 he was subject to wide criticism for claiming abnormally large expense costs from the Scottish Parliament, including travel in his Fife constituency at times he was known to be in Parliament in Edinburgh.  The following month he resigned as an MSP, citing health reasons and not the controversy his expense claim had caused as the reason.

He faced further criticism after his resignation for working at ITV Wales despite being "too sick to work". He was replaced in his seat by Andrew Arbuckle, who had been next on the Liberal Democrat list for Mid Scotland and Fife in 2003. The Scottish Liberal Democrats have confirmed to the press that Raffan is no longer a party member.

References

External links
 

6 May 1999– 7 January 2005

1949 births
Living people
People from Aberdeen
People educated at Glenalmond College
Alumni of Corpus Christi College, Cambridge
Conservative Party (UK) MPs for Welsh constituencies
UK MPs 1983–1987
UK MPs 1987–1992
Liberal Democrat MSPs
Members of the Scottish Parliament 1999–2003
Members of the Scottish Parliament 2003–2007